Lethian Dreams is a French doom metal band, founded in 2002 by Carline Van Roos and Matthieu Sachs, also known for their 
work in the bands Aythis and Remembrance. Starting as an atmospheric doom metal band, Lethian Dreams evolved later to a more ethereal sound, adding elements from different musical styles. The band self-describes its music as "ethereal doom metal" but elements from black metal, shoegaze or post-metal can also be found in their music.

History 
After releasing 3 demos from 2002 to 2006, the band released its first album Bleak Silver Streams in 2009. This first work summed up the result of the 5 first years of existence of the band by featuring most of the songs from the demos. The music blends atmospheric keyboards, heavy guitars with ethereal voices and death vocals. A style clearly enrooted in atmospheric doom metal and often compared to bands such as Anathema or the 3rd and the Mortal. The first album is also the only album (except from the demos) to feature death growls, which are performed by Carlos D'Agua (Before the Rain). In 2012, the band released its second album, this time with brand new songs, in a style different from the previous one : the band focuses on the ethereal side of their music and uses rawer guitar riffing.
In October 2013, the band announced the recording of their 3rd album. The album, Red Silence Lodge was released in 2014.

Current members 
Matthieu Sachs – guitars, keyboards (2002–present)
Carline Van Roos – guitars, keyboards, drums, bass, vocals (2002–present)
Pierre Bourguignon – drums (2013–present)

Past members 
Carlos D'Agua – harsh vocals (2006–2009)

Discography

Studio albums 
Bleak Silver Streams (2009)
Season of Raven Words (2012)
Red Silence Lodge (2014)
A Shadow of Memories (2020)

EPs 
Just Passing By and Unreleased Requiems (2011)
Last Echoes of Silence (2021)

Demos 
Mournful Whispers (2003) 
Lost in Grief (2004) 
Requiem for My Soul, Eternal Rest for My Heart (2006)

References

External links
Lethian Dreams website
Lethian Dreams @ Encyclopaedia Metallum
Lethian Dreams @ Metalstorm
 Lethian Dreams @ Doom-metal.com
Remembrance – other band of Carline Van Roos and Matthieu Sachs
Aythis - solo project from Carline Van Roos

2002 establishments in France
French dark wave musical groups
French doom metal musical groups
Musical groups established in 2002
Musical groups from Paris